Florida Wing Civil Air Patrol (CAP) is part of Southeast Region (SER) and the highest echelon of Civil Air Patrol in the state of Florida. Florida Wing headquarters is on the Sun n Fun campus located at Lakeland Linder International Airport in Lakeland, Florida. Florida Wing consists of over 3,500 cadet and adult members at over 66 locations across the state of Florida. Col Luis Negron assumed command from Col Luis Garcia on July 24, 2021 at the Florida Wing Conference in Tampa, Florida.

Celebrating its 80th anniversary in 2021, Civil Air Patrol is congressionally chartered and operates as a 501(c)(3) nonprofit corporation. CAP performs services for the federal government as the official civilian auxiliary of the U.S. Air Force and for states and local communities. CAP is a strategic member of the Total Force, consisting of the Air Force, Air National Guard, Air Force Reserve and Air Force auxiliary. CAP performs three primary missions — Cadet Programs, Aerospace Education and Emergency Services.

History

Prior to the creation of Civil Air Patrol, the state of Florida created its own group of paramilitary civilian aviators to patrol its coastline. Organized in 1941, the First Air Squadron was mustered in on May 28, 1941. Organized under the Florida Defense Force, the First Air Squadron was made up of civilian volunteers, and all aircraft were privately owned. Members were required to either have a private pilot's license or have served in the military at least one year to join. The First Air Squadron patrolled the Florida coast for U-boats and assisted in search and rescue missions.

Civil Air Patrol was created on December 1, 1941. In Florida, the First Air Squadron was reorganized as a Civil Air Patrol unit. By early January 1942, Florida wing was organized into seven different operation groups, each with a commander and staff.

Vision
Florida Wing, Civil Air Patrol will  continue to build the exemplary organization of citizen volunteers performing missions for the communities of  Florida... Train for Response, Succeed in our Response, Excel in our Service.

Mission statement
Volunteers serving America's communities, saving lives, and shaping futures.

Command Objectives
 Strengthen  our  organization  through  positive  and  professional  interaction.
 Maximize  Florida  Wing,  Civil  Air  Patrol  support  to  our  local,  state,  federal,  and  tribal  partners,  communities,  and  members.
 Sustain  a  capable,  responsive,  and  accountable  organization.

Mission
Civil Air Patrol has three primary missions: aerospace education, cadet programs, and emergency services.

Emergency services
National:

 Conducts 90% of inland search and rescue in the U.S. as tasked by the Air Force Rescue Coordination Center and other agencies. 
 Coordinates Air Force-assigned missions through the CAP National Operations Center at Maxwell AFB, Ala., at a cost of $120-$165 per flying hour. 
 Has nearly 7,000 aircrew members and over 33,000 emergency responders trained to FEMA standards. 
 Provides over 450 chaplains and 600 character development instructors who minister to youth and adult members and help comfort victims of disasters. 
 Performs highly specialized aerial imagery for disaster damage assessment and more to support local, state and national agencies. 
 Provides air intercept training, impact assessment, light transport, communications support and low-level route surveys for the Air Force.
 Transports time-sensitive medical materials, blood products and body tissues when commercial resources are unavailable. 
 Maintains an extensive national network of VHF and HF communications.    Florida:

 The wing provided aircraft, aircrews and small Unmanned Aerial Systems teams in response to the Puerto Rico earthquakes. 
 Pilots provided 636 CAP cadet orientation flights,13 ROTC orientation flights, 52 Junior ROTC orientation flights and 14 teacher orientation flights. 
 Aircrews flew 30 air defense target of interest flights for Fertile Keynote, 86 sorties for Exercise America’s Shield and 42 low-level route survey sorties for Hurlburt Air Force Base. 
 The wing flew 11 sorties in support of the Federal Emergency Management Agency for the responses to hurricanes Isaac and Sally.
 Members participated in Falcon Virgo, AEROnet, Eglin AFB fire patrol, U.S. Army Air and Missile Defense Command radar training, Charlotte County harbor patrol, Felix Keynote, Fertile Hawk and Super Bowl air intercept training.

Cadet programs
Through their experiences as CAP cadets, young people develop into responsible citizens and become tomorrow's aerospace leaders. CAP is the volunteer, nonprofit auxiliary of the U.S. Air Force. Its three missions are to develop its cadets, educate Americans on the importance of aviation and space, and perform life-saving, humanitarian missions.

 Attracts over 24,000 members ages 12 through 20 for participation in its cadet programs. 
 Educates youth in four main program areas — leadership, aerospace, fitness and character development. 
 Enriches school curricula through afterschool programs. 
 Meets the high school graduation requirement in Florida for 100 community service/volunteer hours. 
 Offers orientation flights in powered and glider aircraft, as well as flight training scholarships. 
 Provides activities and competitions for cadets at the local, state, regional and national levels. 
 Provides opportunities for community involvement through color guard/drill team and emergency service missions. 
 Challenges youth to be ambassadors for a drug-free lifestyle. 
 Introduces thousands of cadets to cyber defense careers through CyberPatriot, the Air Force Association’s National Youth Cyber Security Competition. 
 CAP cadets make up about 10% of the Air Force Academy’s classes. 
 Cadets who have earned the Gen. Billy Mitchell Award enlist in the Air Force, U.S. Army and U.S. Coast Guard at a higher pay grade. 
 Participates in the International Air Cadet Exchange program. 
 Awards college scholarships in several disciplines.

Florida Wing, 2020 Cadet Programs Statistics (note - lower numbers than usual due to COVID19 organizational wide stand-down):

 More than 370 cadets attended a wing-wide encampment. 
 Four cadets achieved the Gen. Carl A. Spaatz Award, Civil Air Patrol’s top cadet honor. 
 The St. Augustine Composite Squadron cadet team placed second nationally in the All Service Division during the Air Force Association’s first virtual national CyberPatriot cyber security competition and third in the CISCO NetAcad Challenge. 
 Two cadets earned their private pilot certificate through CAP’s Cadet Wings program. 
 Four cadets received CAP flight scholarships and one was awarded a CAP academic scholarship. 
 The Cadet Leadership Academy drew 193 cadets.   
Florida Wing 2021 Quality Cadet Unit Award Recipients:  NORTH PERRY COMPOSITE SQUADRON  SRQ COMPOSITE SQDN, Sarasota  CHARLOTTE COUNTY COMPOSITE SQDN  SEMINOLE COMPOSITE SQUADRON  SAINT AUGUSTINE COMPOSITE SQUADRON  POLK COUNTY COMPOSITE SQUADRON  PATRICK COMPOSITE SQDN  TAMIAMI COMPOSITE SQDN  JACKSONVILLE COMPOSITE SQDN  PENSACOLA CADET SQDN  TALLAHASSEE COMPOSITE SQDN  WESLEY CHAPEL CADET SQUADRON  463RD COMPOSITE SQUADRON, Kissimmee

Aerospace education
Civil Air Patrol offers numerous products and programs -- free to members -- in fulfillment of both its Internal (cadets and senior members) and External (educators and students) Aerospace Education mission. Explore the Aerospace Education section of the Civil Air Patrol website at GoCivilAirPatrol.com for information on specific programs including STEM Kits, the K-6th grade Aerospace Connections in Education (ACE)program, Aerospace Education Excellence (AEX), Teacher Orientation Program (TOP) flights (in CAP aircraft), and more. Florida Wing maintained educational partnerships with 76 high schools; supported the National Space Familiarization Course; and provided a space flight orientation course.

Organization
Florida Wing is divided into six groups across the state, with each squadron or flight being assigned to a group based on its geographical location.  The Wing comprises 21 Cadet Squadrons, 7 Senior Squadrons, 29 Composite Squadrons (composed of both Cadets and Senior Members), and the Support and Legislative Squadrons.

Legal protection
Under the State of Florida Civil Air Patrol Leave Act, members of Civil Air Patrol who are employed within the boundaries of Florida, by a company which employs fifteen or more people, are allowed up to fifteen days of unpaid leave annually for the purpose of participating in Civil Air Patrol training or missions. Employees will not be required to use accrued vacation or sick leave or any other type of accrued leave prior to taking unpaid Civil Air Patrol leave, but may choose to use such benefits. Employers are forbidden from requiring Civil Air Patrol members to use vacation, annual, compensatory, or similar leave time for the period during which the member was on Civil Air Patrol leave. Employers are also forbidden from penalizing or firing employees for taking Civil Air Patrol leave. These employee rights are codified under Florida Statutes § 252.55.

See also
Florida Air National Guard
Florida Naval Militia
Florida State Guard

References

Further reading
Reilly, Thomas. Florida's Flying Minute Men: The Civil Air Patrol, 1941-1943. The Florida Historical Quarterly.
Blazich, Frank. "An Honorable Place in American Air Power: Civil Air Patrol Coastal Patrol Operations 1942-1942" PDF

External links
Florida Wing Civil Air Patrol Official Website

Wings of the Civil Air Patrol
Education in Florida
Military in Florida